The Via Rail FP9ARM was a re-manufactured version of a GMD FP9A Diesel passenger locomotive, rebuilt between 1983 and 1985 by Canadian National Railways at their Pointe St-Charles shops.

History 

In the early 1980s, Via was suffering from reliability problems with its motive power. While an order for GMD F40PHs was expected to be announced, Via needed to something in the interim to improve service on its routes.

Via Rail had a surplus of steam-heated GMD Via FP9A units built in the 1950s and so fifteen of these units were chosen to be re-manufactured. The first twelve units, 6300–6311, were re-manufactured at the CN Pointe St-Charles shops in Montreal while the final three, 6312–6314, were re-manufactured at the CN shops in Moncton, New Brunswick.

The first five, re-manufactured in 1983 and early 1984, were outshopped without steam generators and became Via Rail class GPA-418a while the remainder, re-manufactured with Vapor steam generators in mid-1984 to mid-1985, became Via Rail class GPA-418b.

By 1997 Via Rail had retired virtually all of its older steam-heated rolling stock. It was felt that many of the FP9ARMs were still usable, and some of the units had their steam generators and associated piping removed and were retrofitted with head end power alternators. 6300, 6302, 6304, 6307, 6308, 6311 and 6313 all had this done, with the remainder of the units put into storage.

All units were retired and stricken from the active roster upon the completion of delivery of the 900-series P42DCs in late 2001.

Operations 

After rebuilding the FP9ARM units could be found in service across Canada.

In later years the locomotives were used on services in Northern Manitoba and in Northern Quebec.  Their use on these lines allowed for the GMD Via F40PH-2 previously used on these lines to be transferred to other duties.  They remained on these lines until retirement.

Accidents 
 The 6300 was the only locomotive to survive the Hinton train collision on February 4, 1986, which also involved FP7 #6566 and F9 #6633 of the Via Rail No. 4 train, and CN GP38-2(W) #5586 and SD40's #5104 and #5062 of the Canadian National Railway No. 413 westbound freight train.  Following the accident, 6300 was rebuilt with the cab of a former Kansas City Southern F7 and returned to service.
 The 6310 and 6314 were both wrecked in 1993.

Preservation 
The FP9ARMs that were not wrecked and scrapped have survived into preservation.
6300 was used by Via Rail as a shop switcher in Vancouver, BC until being donated to the BC chapter of the National Railway Historical Society. As of late 2019, it currently operates at Heber Valley Railroad. 
6304 and 6311 are currently held under private ownership at the Alberta Railway Museum.
6309 has been loaned to the Canadian Railway Museum, located at Saint-Constant, Quebec.
6305 is in use by Ontario Southland Railway as number 6508 near Woodstock, ON, Canada and sees regular duty pulling trains from the CAMI GM Yard in Ingersoll, ON, Canada to the CP yard in Woodstock, ON, Canada.
6306 is preserved as CN 6520 at the West Coast Railway Association. 
6307 and 6313 are currently owned and operated by the Canadian Pacific Railway as Canadian Pacific 4106 and 4107, part of the Royal Canadian Pacific tourist trains.
6302 and 6308 were sold to the Texas State Railroad where they were renumbered 125 and 126, respectively. Both have been restored into a vintage Missouri–Kansas–Texas Railroad "Texas Special" inspired paint scheme.
6301 remains on VIA property, stored at the Montreal Maintenance Centre.

Fleet details

Gallery

See also 

 List of GMD Locomotives

References

External links 
 Stamps with FP9

Via Rail locomotives
General Motors Diesel locomotives
Diesel-electric locomotives of Canada
Diesel-electric locomotives of the United States
B-B locomotives
Railway locomotives introduced in 1983
Standard gauge locomotives of Canada
Standard gauge locomotives of the United States